Tazeh Qaleh (also Romanized as Tāzeh Qal'eh) is a village in Gavdul-e Gharbi Rural District of the Central District of Malekan County, East Azerbaijan province, Iran. At the 2006 National Census, its population was 3,691 in 1,035 households. The following census in 2011 counted 3,827 people in 1,113 households. The latest census in 2016 showed a population of 4,058 people in 1,340 households; it was the largest village in its rural district.

References 

Malekan County

Populated places in East Azerbaijan Province

Populated places in Malekan County